"The Things That You Do" is a song performed by American R&B singer Gina Thompson from her debut album, Nobody Does It Better (1996). The single version was released as the Bad Boy Remix featuring Missy Elliott, who gained notability and mainstream attention for her unique signature, "Hee-Hee-How" punchline. Elliott's contribution managed to help the single crack the top 20 on Billboard's Hot R&B/Hip-Hop Songs chart, where it peaked at #12 and spent a total of 29 weeks. The song also appeared on the US Billboard Hot 100 chart, where it peaked at #41.

In 2007, the song's chorus was sampled and covered by American musical duo Nina Sky in DJ Envy & Red Café's single, "Things You Do."

Background 
The original version of "The Things That You Do" was written and produced by Rodney Jerkins, and appears on Thompson's debut album.

The remix version, entitled "The Things That You Do (Bad Boy Remix)" is the most well-known version of the song and features a prominent sample of Bob James' "Take Me to the Mardi Gras" from his album, Two (1975). The remix features a guest vocal by American hip-hop artist Missy Elliott and backing vocals by then-Bad Boy R&B group 112.

Music video 
A music video for the well-known "Bad Boy Remix" version was filmed in New York City in the summer of 1996 and was directed by Andras Mahr. This version, like the single, also received heavy airplay on BET and MTV. The video features appearances by Sean "Diddy" Combs (then known as Puff Daddy), The Notorious B.I.G. and Rodney Jerkins. Missy Elliott also performs her rap in the video.

Track listings and formats
UK CD single
 "Things That You Do" (Bad Boy Remix) (Club Mix) — 4:32   
 "Things That You Do" (Bad Boy Remix) (Instrumental) — 4:32   
 "Things That You Do" (Bad Boy Remix) (Acapella) — 3:24   
 "Things That You Do" (Album Version) — 4:07

US 12" vinyl
 "The Things That You Do" (Bad Boy Remix / Club Mix) — 4:32   
 "The Things That You Do" (Bad Boy Remix / Instrumental) — 4:32   
 "The Things That You Do" (Bad Boy Remix / Acapella) — 3:42
 "The Things That You Do" — 4:36   
 "The Things That You Do" (Instrumental) — 4:40   
 "The Things That You Do" (Acapella) — 4:32

US cassette tape
 "The Things That You Do" (Darkchild Radio) (featuring Craig Mack, Mr. Mike Nitty & Raekwon) — 4:03   
 "The Things That You Do" (Bad Boy Remix with Rap) (featuring Missy Elliott) — 3:43

US CD/Maxi-single
 "The Things That You Do" (Darkchild Radio) (featuring Craig Mack, Mr. Mike Nitty & Raekwon the Chef) — 4:03   
 "The Things That You Do" (Darkchild Remix) (featuring Craig Mack, Mr. Mike Nitty & Raekwon the Chef) — 6:00   
 "The Things That You Do" (Darkchild Instrumental) — 5:55   
 "The Things That You Do" (Bad Boy Remix/Club Mix) (featuring Missy Elliott) — 4:32   
 "The Things That You Do" (Bad Boy Remix/Instrumental) — 4:32

Charts
The song became Thompson's sole chart appearance on the US Billboard Hot 100, peaking at #41. However, the song was more successful on the R&B singles chart where it reached #12 and spent a total of 29 weeks on the latter chart.

References 

Songs written by Rodney Jerkins
Song recordings produced by Rodney Jerkins
Missy Elliott songs
Songs written by Missy Elliott
1996 songs
Songs written by Daron Jones
Hip hop soul songs